The Denel 35mm Dual Purpose Gun (35DPG) is a close-in weapon system (CIWS) for warships built in South Africa by Denel Land Systems. It is currently in service on the Valour-class frigates of the South African Navy.

Role
Its primary role is to defend against attack by helicopters, fixed-wing aircraft and missiles. It has a secondary role against surface vessels and shore targets, both in symmetrical and asymmetrical warfare and also in law enforcement where accuracy is critical because collateral damage is unacceptable.

Design
The system consists of two GA35 rapid-fire automatic cannons derived from the Oerlikon 35mm, mounted side by side in an unmanned low radar observable turret. Target acquisition is by the installed search and track radar, while an optronic tracking system with infrared and visible spectrum modes provides fire-control. A control console is located in the ship's operations room, although the system operates automatically in the air-defence mode. An emergency control panel is fitted on the rear of the turret. The turret does not penetrate the deck on which it is mounted. On the Valour class frigates it is mounted on top of the helicopter hangar. The turret is fully self-contained and requires only an electrical supply and a radar data feed from the ship's combat management system and the control console. The turret is capable of unlimited full circle traverse at up to 70° per second and elevates from 10° below to 85° above horizontal at up to 40° per second.

The turret's on-board computers do the ballistic calculations and fire-control.  The high level of self-containment and compact size and low weight allows installation on a wide variety of ships down to as small as 200 tonnes.

Ammunition
The cannons fire the full range of NATO standard 35×228 mm ammunition; HEI, HEI-T, SAPHEI, APCI-T, Prac and Prac-T; all manufactured by Rheinmetall Denel Munition's PMP division.

Anti-missile
In the anti-missile role it uses Advanced Hit Efficiency And Destruction (AHEAD) ammunition from RWM Schweiz AG. This round ejects 152 tungsten projectiles at a predetermined distance, between 40 and 10 m, from the target. A 25-round burst of AHEAD rounds produces 3,800 of these small projectiles to destroy the incoming missile. Cruise missiles can be destroyed at 2.5 km and high speed missiles at 1.5 km range.

The system's anti-missile capability is further enhanced by adding Denel's Closed Loop Fire Correction System, which tracks projectiles all the way to the target. This allows for real-time correction of bias errors in the control system and compensation for atmospheric conditions.

See also
 Aselsan GOKDENIZ—comparable Turkish system
 Oerlikon Millennium 35 mm Naval Revolver Gun System—comparable Swiss-German system

References

External links
 DLS 35mm DPG Naval Turret – Manufacturer's official website.

Close-in weapon systems
Post–Cold War weapons of South Africa
Naval anti-aircraft guns
Autocannon
35 mm artillery
Weapons countermeasures
Denel